The Hungry Actors is a 1915 American short comedy film featuring Harold Lloyd.

Cast
 Roy Stewart
 Jane Novak 
 Harold Lloyd
 Neely Edwards
 Violet MacMillan
 Martha Mattox
 Bobby Vernon

See also
 Harold Lloyd filmography

External links

1915 films
1915 comedy films
Silent American comedy films
American black-and-white films
Films directed by Hal Roach
1915 short films
American silent short films
American comedy short films
1910s American films
1910s English-language films